The 2013–14 HockeyAllsvenskan season began on 12 September 2013 and included 14 teams. IF Björklöven, Swedish champions in 1987, rejoined the league, following a three-year stint in Division 1 (now named Hockeyettan) after their near-bankruptcy in 2010. They replaced Tingsryds AIF, who were demoted to Division 1 following a third-place finish in the 2013 HockeyAllsvenskan qualifiers. Also new to the league were Timrå IK and Rögle BK, both of whom were demoted from Elitserien (now called the SHL), replacing Leksands IF and Örebro HK who were promoted up to the SHL in their stead.

The 2013–14 HockeyAllsvenskan was covered by media partner Viasat, who purchased the rights to the league in 2011.

Format
In the regular season, each team plays every other team twice at home and twice away, which gives each team a 52-game schedule.  Following the regular season, the two teams with the worst records are forced to play a qualification tournament to avoid demotion to Sweden's third-tier league, Division 1 (now named Hockeyettan).  The teams that finished 4th–7th advanced to a double-round robin playoff series, the winner of which joined the top three teams in the SHL qualifiers, where they will have a chance to qualify for promotion to the Swedish Hockey League, in competition with the two teams with the worst records from the 2013–14 SHL season.

Participating teams

Regular season

Standings

Post-season

Playoffs
A playoff series (in previous seasons Förkvalserien) was played between the teams ranked fourth through seventh in the regular season. They played a double round-robin tournament, with the winner (Rögle BK) continuing to the qualifiers for the 2014–15 SHL season. The teams were allocated points before the start of the playoffs based on their position in the regular season standings. BIK Karlskoga were given four points, Karlskrona HK were given three points, Mora IK were given two points and Rögle BK were given one point.

SHL qualifiers

HockeyAllsvenskan qualifiers
Teams ranked 13th and 14th after the regular season, IF Troja/Ljungby and IF Björklöven, were forced to defend their spots in the league in the HockeyAllsvenskan qualifiers. They played a double round-robin tournament against the four playoff winners from the third-tier Division 1. IF Björklöven successfully defended their HockeyAllsvenskan spot while IF Troja/Ljungby were relegated to Division 1 at the expense of HC Vita Hästen.

References

 
2013-14 HockeyAllsvenskan season

2
Swe